Guro Station is a subway station in Guro District in Seoul, South Korea. It serves Seoul Subway Line 1.

The Gyeongin and Gyeongbu Lines separate at this station, with the former going west and the latter south. In addition, the Line 1 train service depot is located south of the station between Guro and Gasan Digital Complex Stations; several tracks diverge and lead to the depot.

All non-metro trains such as KTX, ITX-Saemaeul, Saemaeul-ho, Mugunghwa-ho, and Nuriro pass without stopping at Gyeongbu Line B (Seoul Station to Cheonan Express). Trains from Incheon Station and Shinchang Station and trains bound for Incheon and Shinchang are joined and diverted, with all trains on Line 1 in the Seoul metropolitan area except Gyeongbu Line B stopping, and some trains use the station as a city and destination.

Vicinity

Exit 1 : AK Plaza Guro Main Store
Exit 2 : Sinmirim Elementary School

Near Subway Station
 CGV cinema
 AK Plaza

Gallery

References

Seoul Metropolitan Subway stations
Railway stations opened in 1973
Metro stations in Guro District, Seoul
Gyeongbu Line
Gyeongin Line
Seoul Subway Line 1